Jonathan Whitcombe (born 19 April 1977) is an English professional wrestler, better known by his ring name Jonny Storm. He has worked for many independent promotions across the United Kingdom, including the Frontier Wrestling Alliance, Real Quality Wrestling and One Pro Wrestling. He has also worked in the United States, for promotions such as Ring of Honor, Pro Wrestling Guerrilla, Combat Zone Wrestling, and Total Nonstop Action Wrestling, as well as working in Japan.

Professional wrestling career

British and other European promotions
At the start of his career, Storm became a mainstay in the Frontier Wrestling Alliance (FWA). He also competed for All-Star Wrestling. Storm began wrestling for Irish Whip Wrestling in March 2005, where he had a series of matches against M-Dogg 20. Storm was one of the trainers for ITV's Celebrity Wrestling in 2005. Although the show was considered a failure, Storm enjoyed it and said it was "a really good experience". Storm has wrestled for numerous other European promotions, including German Stampede Wrestling, Real Quality Wrestling, Rings of Europe and Dutch Championship Wrestling. Also in 2005, he won the Féderation Francophone de Catch promotion's top championship, which he has held since.

One of Storm's most enduring feuds has been with his real-life best friend Jody Fleisch, with whom he has wrestled against in American and British promotions. He has also wrestled regularly for One Pro Wrestling, where, with Fleisch, he was the one half of the first 1PW Tag Team Champions, after they defeated A.J. Styles and Christopher Daniels in a tournament final on 27 May 2006. On 1 January 2007, he won the Athletik Club Wrestling Wrestling Challenge Championship from Toby Nathland, but Nathland defeated him to win it back on 15 December 2007. On 23 March 2007, Storm defeated Maddog Maxx to win the Celtic Wrestling Heavyweight Championship, but he lost it to Maxx in July of that year.

Storm runs his own wrestling holiday camp events between 6 and 12 times a week during summer, Easter and Christmas Holidays. Meanwhile, in the FWA he is currently part of the Flyweight Title Round Robin Tournament, having gained entry into the tournament thanks to another wrestler suffering an injury. He is involved in a bitter feud with Rockstar Spud, an obnoxious flyweight who believes he is the new "Wonderkid" of British wrestling.

American promotions

Storm competed in Xtreme Pro Wrestling (XPW), and was in the tournament to decide the first XPW European Champion, which was created in 2003 through a working relationship between XPW and the FWA. He won the tournament and the championship by defeating Jerry Lynn in the finals at a FWA show in England. Storm made his first appearance for Total Nonstop Action Wrestling (TNA) on 12 March 2003, by competing in a triple threat match for TNA X Division Championship match, against the champion Kid Kash and Amazing Red, in which Kash retained. In May 2003, Storm competed in a cross-promotional show between Ring of Honor and FWA, entitled ROH/FWA Frontiers of Honor, where he lost to A.J. Styles. In September 2003, Storm competed as a member of Team UK during the TNA 2003 Super X Cup Tournament, losing to Teddy Hart in the first round. At the Combat Zone Wrestling (CZW) show, Respect, on 23 August 2003, Storm challenged Sonjay Dutt for the IWA Mid-South Light Heavyweight Championship, but was unsuccessful. He made further appearance for CZW in January 2004. He returned to the States in 2005, wrestling against Petey Williams and Kevin Steen for Pro Wrestling Guerrilla, and against Trik Davis for Independent Wrestling Association Mid-South. He was supposed to be a member of Team UK in the TNA 2006 World X Cup Tournament, however, two of the other members of the team, Nigel McGuinness and Doug Williams were already booked in Japan, and so they were replaced by Team Canada.

Overall Storm worked for more than 80 promotions across the world, working in 16 different countries.

Trainer
Storm has also trained other wrestlers, most notably Erin Marshall.

Championships and accomplishments
All Star Wrestling
ASW People's Championship (1 time)
Alternative Wrestling World
AWW British Heavyweight Championship (2 times)
Association Biterroise de Catch
ABC Tag Team Championship (1 time) - with Ronin Rider
Athletik Club Wrestling
ACW Cruiserweight Championship (4 times)
ACW German Championship (1 time)
ACW Wrestling Challenge Championship (1 time)
ACW Tag Team Championship (1 time) - with Jody Fleisch
Best Of British Wrestling
BOBW Championship (1 time)
British Titles
British Middleweight Championship (1 time)
Celtic Wrestling
CW Heavyweight Championship (1 time)
Combat Zone Wrestling
CZW Match of the Year (2002) - vs. Jody Fleisch
Falling Starr Wrestling
FSW Limitless Championship (1 time) 
Féderation Francophone de Catch
2FC Championship (1 time)
Frontier Wrestling Alliance / XWA
British Heavyweight Championship (1 time)
FWA All England Championship (2 times)
FWA Gold Rush Fifteen Man #1 Contender Battle Royal (2005)
British Inter-Federation Cup (2006) 
Future Championship Wrestling
FCW Heavyweight Championship (1 time)
Global Wrestling Force
GWF Championship (1 time)
International Catch Wrestling Alliance
ICWA Cruiserweight Championship (1 time, current)
ICWA World Junior Heavyweight Championship (1 time)
International Pro Wrestling: United Kingdom
IPW:UK World Championship (1 time)
IPW:UK Tag Team Championship (1 time) - with Andreas Corr 
Extreme Measures Tournament (2004) 
International Wrestling Association: Switzerland
IWA Switzerland Light Heavyweight Championship (1 time, current)
Ligaunabhängig
Dragonhearts Championship (1 time)
Nitro Pro Wrestling Alliance
NPWA Tag Team Championship (1 time) - with Gary Wild
One Pro Wrestling
1PW World Tag Team Championship (1 time) - with Jody Fleisch
Playhouse Wrestlefest
Wrestlefest Tag Team Championship (1 time) - with Jody Fleisch
Plex Wrestling
Plex-ceed Championship (1 time)
Plex Wrestling British Championship (1 time)
Premier Promotions
PWF Lightweight Championship (3 times, current)
One Night Tournament (2009)  
Rumblemania Trophy (2008) 
Rings Of Europe
RoE King Of Europe Championship (1 time)
Scottish School Of Wrestling
SSW Hardcore Championship (1 time)
SLAM Wrestling
SLAM Championship (1 time)
Sliced Bread Wrestling
SBW The Golden Toaster
The Wrestling Alliance
TWA British Commonwealth Championship (2 times)
TWA British Welterweight Championship (2 times)
United Kingdom Pro Wrestling
UKPW Inter-Regional Championship (1 time)
Vertigo Pro Wrestling
VPW Heavyweight Championship (1 time)
Westside Xtreme Wrestling
wXw World Lightweight Championship (1 time)
World Association of Wrestling
WAW British Lightweight Championship (2 times)
World Stars Of Wrestling
WSW Tag Team Championship (1 time, current) - with Jody Fleisch
Xtreme Pro Wrestling
XPW European Championship (1 time)

References

External links

Jonny Storm's Home Page
Online World of Wrestling profile

1977 births
English male professional wrestlers
Living people
People from Harlow